Voting to elect eleven members of the Lebanese parliament took place in the South III district (one of three electoral districts in South Lebanon) on 6 May 2018, part of the general election of that year. The constituency had 460,565 voters, out of whom 228,563 voted. The district elects 8 Shiite parliamentarians, 1 Druze, 1 Greek Orthodox and 1 Sunni.

Demographics 
In third southern electoral district 6 lists were registered. The electorate is predominantly Shia (80.1%). 6.35% of the electorate is Sunni, 5.27% Maronite, 3.65% Druze, 2.45% Greek Orthodox, 1.8% Greek Catholic and 0.39% from other Christian communities.

Voting 
The Amal-Hezbollah coalition fielded the "Hope and Loyalty" list. It includes a Baathist Sunni candidate, Kassem Hachem, who is fielded as Amal candidate and officially not sponsored by the Baath Party.

The Future Movement, the Free Patriotic Movement and the Lebanese Democratic Party fielded a joint list called "The South is Worth It", a list that L'Orient Le Jour labelled "supplementary" to the Amal-Hezbollah list. It includes a pro-Future independent Sunni candidate, Imad Khatib, who has business links to Amal leader Berri. Three Shia candidates (Badruddin, Sharafuddin and Osseiran) were previously close to Hezbollah. Two pro-FPM independent candidates were included in the list, Chadi Massaad (Greek Orthodox) and Mourhaf Ramadan (Shia). Druze candidate Dr. Wissam Charouf is a member of the Political Council of the Lebanese Democratic Party.

"A Vote for Change" list was fielded by the Lebanese Communist Party, the Communist Action Organization in Lebanon and independents. It includes a pro-SSNP independent candidate, Hussein Baydoun. The "National" coalition fielded a list with five candidates.

The two remaining of the lists in the fray took a more confrontative approach towards the Hezbollah-Amal dominance of the local political scene. The "Shibna Hakki" list was fielded by the Lebanese Forces and Shia dissidents, with the Shia journalist Ali Al-Amin on the list. Al-Amin had been publicly labelled as one of the "Shia of the [U.S.] Embassy" by Hezbollah general secretary Nasrallah. Al-Amin and fellow candidate and journalist Imad Komeyha, had been signatories to the 2017 call for fresh elections to the High Shia Council. Ahmed Assaad, leader of the Lebanese Option Party, fielded an anti-Hezbollah list of his own with candidates from his party. The list included Al-Assaad's wife Abeer Ramadan.

Candidates

References 

2018 Lebanese general election